The Vietnam Motor Show is an international auto show that will return in October 2022 after a two-year absence due to the COVID-19 pandemic.

Editions
 2004 Vietnam Motor Show
 2005 Vietnam Motor Show
 2006 Vietnam Motor Show
 2007 Vietnam Motor Show
 2008 Vietnam Motor Show
 2009 Vietnam Motor Show
 2010 Vietnam Motor Show
 2011 Vietnam Motor Show
 2012 Vietnam Motor Show
 2013 Vietnam Motor Show
 2014 Vietnam Motor Show
 2015 Vietnam Motor Show
 2016 Vietnam Motor Show
 2017 Vietnam Motor Show
 2018 Vietnam Motor Show
 2019 Vietnam Motor Show
There was no "Vietnam Motor Show" in 2020 and 2021 due to the COVID-19 pandemic

2022
The 2022 edition took place between October 26–30, with 14 car brands confirming their presence at the event: Audi, Brabus, Honda, Jeep, Lexus, Mercedes-Benz, Mitsubishi Motors, Morgan, MG, RAM, Subaru, Toyota, Volkswagen and Volvo.

In addition, the 2022 Vietnam Motor Show marked the first participation of other means of transport, including trucks, heavy-duty vehicles and electric cars.

Concept cars
 Mitsubishi XFC Concept

Exhibition
The show will be held at the Saigon Exhibition and Convention Center in Ho Chi Minh City.

References

Auto shows
Automotive events
Car culture